Helga Hošková-Weissová, also Helga Weiss, (born 10 November 1929) is a Czech artist, and a Holocaust survivor. She is known for her drawings that depict life at Terezín and her diary, which was published in 2013.

Biography 
Helga Hošková-Weissová was born on 10 November 1929 in Prague-Libeň to an assimilated Jewish family. Her mother, Irena Fuchsova, was a seamstress and her father, Otto Weiss, worked at the state bank in Prague. She was raised in Prague, and shortly after her twelfth birthday on 10 December 1941, she and her parents were deported to the Terezín ghetto. Although they were separated in the camp, it was somewhat possible to see each other and exchange clandestine notes. It is estimated that 15,000 children (younger than 16) were deported to Terezín. Fewer than 100 of the Terezín children deported to Auschwitz survived.

Life at Terezín 
Using her gift for painting and drawing, while at Terezín, Helga wrote a diary that included images from her life in the camp, which survived the war. Her father said to her in December 1941, "draw what you see," she did exactly that. She was held captive in what was called the Girl's Home in room twenty four. Her drawings are a testimony of what everyday life was like for Jews in Terezín.

Deportation to Auschwitz 
In October 1944 at the age of 15, she and her mother were deported to Auschwitz. Whenever new victims arrived, they were sorted. The ones sent to the left went straight to the gas chambers to die, and the ones sent to the right to complete forced labor until death. The person sorting that day may have been the infamous Josef Mengele. Helga convinced him she was old enough to work by claiming she was 18 and was told to go to the right. She also successfully claimed that her mother was younger than she was which saved her mother's life. After ten days, she was transferred from Auschwitz to Freiberg near Dresden, an auxiliary camp of Flossenbürg labor camp where she escaped death. She was then forced to join a 16-day death march to the camp at Mauthausen. She remained there until the camp's liberation on 5 May 1945 by the US Army.

Post-war life 
After World War II ended, Helga went back to Prague and studied at the Academy of Fine Arts. She also studied under the Czech artist Emil Filla from 1950. She worked as an artist and raised a family. After the Velvet Revolution in November 1989, she exhibited her art many times both in Prague and in other places in Europe.

In 2009, she was interviewed by a nonprofit, Post Bellum, for their Stories of the 20th Century Project. As of February 2013, at the age of 83, Helga still lives in the flat she was born in and the same flat from which she was deported from in 1944.

Awards and honors 
In 1993, she was awarded an honorary Doctorate by the Massachusetts College of Art and Design in Boston for her lifetime achievements. In 2009, she was also awarded the Josef Hlávka medal. In October 2009, Vaclav Klaus presented her with the Medal of Merit.

Publications
Her account of her experiences before and during the Holocaust, Helga's Diary: A Young Girl's Account of Life in a Concentration Camp, was published by W. W. Norton & Company on 22 April 2013.

References

External links
 Helga's Diary: A Young Girl's Account of Life in a Concentration Camp - Book Information
 "Arriving at Auschwitz, October 4, 1944" - An excerpt from Helga's Diary

1929 births
Living people
Artists from Prague
Jewish artists
Czech Jews
Czech women artists
Theresienstadt Ghetto survivors
Czech women writers
Auschwitz concentration camp survivors